King is a website geared toward African-American and urban male audiences. It features articles about hip-hop and R&B as well as sports and fashion. The magazine is published by Townsquare Media and was a spinoff from XXL. The magazine was started in 2002. It ceased publication on March 31, 2009, citing failing ad sales as a result of the poor economy and plans to release monthly installments soon. It resumed publication, this time as a quarterly magazine, in late 2009. It was later suspended again, and the website was sold by Harris Publications to Townsquare Media in 2014.

King magazine is mainly characterized by its lavish photoshoots, which usually feature scantily-clad women, often complete with an interview from the featured model. The subjects of these shoots range from professional models such as  Melyssa Ford and Toccara to well-known musicians and actresses, including Trina, Keyshia Cole and Elise Neal. It also features interviews with rappers. The magazine almost exclusively uses pictures from its photoshoots as the cover of the magazine. The Lycos 50 Daily Report noted the magazine received more online searches than Newsweek or Reader's Digest.

References

Further reading

External links
Official site
King Myspace Page

African-American magazines
Defunct magazines published in the United States
Harris Publications titles
Hip hop magazines
Magazines established in 2005
Magazines disestablished in 2009
Magazines published in Connecticut
Men's magazines published in the United States
Online magazines with defunct print editions